Colin Francis Dufty (29 November 1889 – 9 December 1967), was an Australian rules footballer who played with Collingwood in the Victorian Football League (VFL).

Dufty was the son of Photographer Francis Herbert and Louisa (née Palmer) Dufty.

He later served in World War I and World War II.

Notes

External links 

Colin Dufty's profile at Collingwood Forever

1889 births
1967 deaths
Collingwood Football Club players
VFL/AFL players born in Fiji
Australian rules footballers from Victoria (Australia)
Sportspeople from Suva
Fijian people of Irish descent
Fijian emigrants to Australia
Australian people of Irish descent
Australian military personnel of World War I
Military personnel from Melbourne
Australian military personnel of World War II